Daniel Turyna (born 26 February 1998) is a Czech footballer who plays for FK Třinec as a forward.

Career

FK Senica
Turyna made his professional debut for FK Senica against ŠK Slovan Bratislava on 17 July 2016.

References

External links
 FK Senica official club profile
 Eurofotbal profile
  
 Futbalnet Profile

1998 births
Living people
Czech footballers
Association football forwards
AC Sparta Prague players
FC Vysočina Jihlava players
SK Dynamo České Budějovice players
FK Senica players
Slovak Super Liga players
Expatriate footballers in Slovakia
FK Fotbal Třinec players
Czech National Football League players